Major-General Geoffrey Thomas Alexander Armitage  (5 July 1917 – 23 June 1996) was a British Army officer.

Military career
Educated at Haileybury, Armitage was commissioned into the Royal Artillery on 26 August 1937 and served as a war substantive captain in the Second World War. He became Commandant, Royal Armoured Corps Centre in 1962, Chief of Staff, I (British) Corps in 1966 and General Officer Commanding, North East District in August 1970 before retiring in January 1973.

References

1917 births
1996 deaths
British Army major generals
Commanders of the Order of the British Empire
Royal Artillery officers
British Army personnel of World War II